Vinogradi Peak is a peak rising to 1,033 m in Kondofrey Heights on Trinity Peninsula, Antarctic Peninsula.  It is located 1.7 km south of Gurgulyat Peak, 3.7 km west-southwest of Mount Reece, and 4.7 km north of Mount Bradley.

The peak is named after the settlement of Vinogradi, in southwestern Bulgaria.

Location
German-British mapping in 1996.

Maps
 Trinity Peninsula. Scale 1:250000 topographic map No. 5697. Institut für Angewandte Geodäsie and British Antarctic Survey, 1996.
 Antarctic Digital Database (ADD). Scale 1:250000 topographic map of Antarctica. Scientific Committee on Antarctic Research (SCAR). Since 1993, regularly updated.

Notes

References
 Bulgarian Antarctic Gazetteer. Antarctic Place-names Commission. (details in Bulgarian, basic data in English)
 Vinogradi Peak. SCAR Composite Antarctic Gazetteer

External links
 Vinogradi Peak. Copernix satellite image

Mountains of Trinity Peninsula
Bulgaria and the Antarctic